The 2022–23 K.V. Mechelen season is the club's 119th season in existence and the fourth consecutive season in the top flight of Belgian football. In addition to the domestic league, Mechelen will participate in this season's edition of the Belgian Cup. The season covers the period from 1 July 2022 to 30 June 2023.

Players

First-team squad

Out on loan

Other players under contract

Pre-season and friendlies

Competitions

Overview

Belgian Pro League

League table

Results summary

Results by round

Matches
The league fixtures were announced on 22 June 2022.

Belgian Cup

Notes

References

K.V. Mechelen seasons
K.V. Mechelen